Clarence Hill may refer to:

 Clarence Hill (boxer) (born 1951), Bermudan Olympic boxer
 Clarence Hill (murderer) (1957–2006), petitioner in the U.S. Supreme Court case of Hill v. McDonough, executed for murder

See also 
 Hill (surname)